In seven-dimensional geometry, a runcinated 7-orthoplex is a convex uniform 7-polytope with 3rd order truncations (runcination) of the regular 7-orthoplex.

There are 16 unique runcinations of the 7-orthoplex with permutations of truncations, and cantellations. 8 are more simply constructed from the 7-cube.

These polytopes are among 127 uniform 7-polytopes with B7 symmetry.

Runcinated 7-orthoplex

Alternate names
 Small prismated hecatonicosoctaexon (acronym: spaz) (Jonathan Bowers)

Images

Biruncinated 7-orthoplex

Alternate names
 Small biprismated hecatonicosoctaexon (Acronym sibpaz) (Jonathan Bowers)

Images

Runcitruncated 7-orthoplex

Alternate names
 Prismatotruncated hecatonicosoctaexon (acronym: potaz) (Jonathan Bowers)

Images

Biruncitruncated 7-orthoplex

Alternate names
 Biprismatotruncated hecatonicosoctaexon (acronym: baptize) (Jonathan Bowers)

Images

Runcicantellated 7-orthoplex

Alternate names
 Prismatorhombated hecatonicosoctaexon (acronym: parz) (Jonathan Bowers)

Images

Biruncicantellated 7-orthoplex

Alternate names
 Biprismatorhombated hecatonicosoctaexon (acronym: boparz) (Jonathan Bowers)

Images

Runcicantitruncated 7-orthoplex

Alternate names
 Great prismated hecatonicosoctaexon (acronym: gopaz) (Jonathan Bowers)

Images

Biruncicantitruncated 7-orthoplex

Alternate names
 Great biprismated hecatonicosoctaexon (acronym: gibpaz) (Jonathan Bowers)

Images

Notes

References
 H.S.M. Coxeter:
 H.S.M. Coxeter, Regular Polytopes, 3rd Edition, Dover New York, 1973
 Kaleidoscopes: Selected Writings of H.S.M. Coxeter, edited by F. Arthur Sherk, Peter McMullen, Anthony C. Thompson, Asia Ivic Weiss, Wiley-Interscience Publication, 1995,  Wiley: Kaleidoscopes: Selected Writings of H.S.M. Coxeter
 (Paper 22) H.S.M. Coxeter, Regular and Semi Regular Polytopes I, [Math. Zeit. 46 (1940) 380-407, MR 2,10]
 (Paper 23) H.S.M. Coxeter, Regular and Semi-Regular Polytopes II, [Math. Zeit. 188 (1985) 559-591]
 (Paper 24) H.S.M. Coxeter, Regular and Semi-Regular Polytopes III, [Math. Zeit. 200 (1988) 3-45]
 Norman Johnson Uniform Polytopes, Manuscript (1991)
 N.W. Johnson: The Theory of Uniform Polytopes and Honeycombs, Ph.D. (1966)
  o3o3o3x3o3o4x - spaz, o3x3o3o3x3o4o - sibpaz, o3o3o3x3x3o4x - potaz, o3o3x3o3x3x4o - baptize, o3o3o3x3x3o4x - parz, o3x3o3x3x3o4o - boparz, o3o3o3x3x3x4x - gopaz, o3o3x3x3x3x3o - gibpaz

External links 
 Polytopes of Various Dimensions
 Multi-dimensional Glossary

7-polytopes